Dietsch may refer to:

 Dietsch (surname), a surname

Languages
 German (disambiguation)
 Low Dietsch, transitional Limburgish-Ripuarian dialects
 Low German (disambiguation)
 Low German
 Middle Dutch